Golden Gloves is a 1961 Direct Cinema documentary directed by Gilles Groulx about boxers preparing for a Golden Gloves tournament in Montreal. The film is narrated by Claude Jutra.

Golden Gloves focuses on three Montreal boxers in training, exploring their lives and hopes. The 1961 film marked a shift among French-Canadian filmmakers at the NFB away from folkloric films towards works that dealt with contemporary Quebec society.

One of the featured fighters, Black Canadian Ronald Jones, was later cast in a small role in Michel Brault's 1967 drama Entre la mer et l'eau douce. A sequence with Jones and his brother was also used in the 2008 production The Memories of Angels.

Release
During its 1964–1965 season, CBC Television aired Golden Gloves as part of its NFB Presents series of short films.

References

External links
Watch Golden Gloves at NFB.ca

1961 films
Documentary films about Montreal
Canadian short documentary films
Black-and-white documentary films
National Film Board of Canada documentaries
1960s French-language films
Documentary films about boxing
Films directed by Gilles Groulx
1961 documentary films
Golden Gloves
National Film Board of Canada short films
1960s English-language films
Canadian black-and-white films
Documentary films about Black Canadians
Canadian boxing films
1960s multilingual films
Canadian multilingual films
Canadian sports documentary films
1960s Canadian films